Titanocene pentasulfide is the organotitanium compound with the formula (C5H5)2TiS5, commonly abbreviated as Cp2TiS5. This metallocene exists as a bright red solid that is soluble in organic solvents. It is of academic interest as a precursor to unusual allotropes of elemental sulfur as well as some related inorganic rings.

Preparation and structure
Titanocene pentasulfide is prepared by treating Cp2TiCl2 with polysulfide salts: It was first produced by the addition of elemental sulfur to titanocene dicarbonyl:
(C5H5)2Ti(CO)2 +  S8 → (C5H5)2TiS5 + 2 CO

The complex is viewed as a pseudotetrahedral complex of Ti(IV). The Ti–S distances are 2.420 and 2.446 Å and the S–S bond distances are of a normal range, 2.051–2.059 Å. The molecule exhibits a dynamic NMR spectrum owing to the chair–chair equilibrium of the TiS5 ring which equivalizes the Cp signals at high temperatures.

Reactions
Cp2TiS5 reacts with sulfur and selenium chlorides, ExCl2, to afford titanocene dichloride and various S5+x and S5Sex rings. Illustrative is the synthesis of S7 from disulfur dichloride:
(C5H5)2TiS5 + S2Cl2 → (C5H5)2TiCl2 + S7

It also reacts with alkenes and ketenes to give heterocycles composed of Ti, C and S. With trialkylphosphines, the cycle dimerize into rings of various sizes, depending on the trialkylphosphine used.

References

Sulfides
Titanocenes
Titanium(IV) compounds